The 2023 Central Michigan Chippewas football team will represent Central Michigan University in the 2023 NCAA Division I FBS football season. They are led by fifth-year head coach Jim McElwain and play their home games at Kelly/Shorts Stadium as members of the West Division of the Mid-American Conference.

Previous season

The Chippewas finished the 2022 season 4–8 and 3–5 in the MAC to finish tied for fourth place in the West Division.

Schedule

References

Central Michigan
Central Michigan Chippewas football seasons
Central Michigan Chippewas football